Kennametal is an American supplier of tooling and industrial materials founded in 1938 by Philip M. McKenna in the Latrobe, Pennsylvania, area.

Production
Kennametal products:
Blades, disks, skins, fuel control systems, and landing gear for the aerospace industry
Synthetic fertilizers for agriculture
Camshafts, crankshafts, cylinder heads, rotors, calipers and differentials for automobiles
Roofing and abrasives for home construction
Asphalt, stabilization tools, and tunneling equipment for road construction
Woodworking tools
Machining industries: 
 Machine tools: Machining centers, turning centers (CNC lathes), automatic lathes (screw machines) 
 Tooling for machine tools: 
 Indexable toolholders, collets 
 fixtures 
 cutting tools (via  Products Group, a consolidation of various brands in this industry): inserts, tool bits, milling cutters, taps and dies, metal sawing cutters and tooling 
Mining equipment
Abrasives and flow control for the oil industry
Generating equipment for electric power plants
Fluids for the paper industry
Wheels and axles for rail transport
Custom engineering

Brands 

In 2009, Kennametal announced that they migrated all its current brands into two distinct portfolios: WIDIA Products Group and Kennametal Products Group.

WIDIA Products Group 
On August 30, 2002, Kennametal completed acquisition of Widia Group from Miacron Inc. for 188 million Euros in cash. This group markets four brands WIDIA, Hanita, and WIDIA GTD. The GTD stands for Greenfield Tap & Die and was initially formed in 1912.

Kennametal Products Group 
Kennametal Products Group provides metalworking tools, metal powders, and wear-resistant coatings such as Conforma-Clad and Stellite.

See also 
 Stellite

References

External links

Widia.com

American companies established in 1938
Companies listed on the New York Stock Exchange
Companies based in Westmoreland County, Pennsylvania
Latrobe, Pennsylvania
1938 establishments in Pennsylvania
Companies listed on the Bombay Stock Exchange